The Intent 2: The Come Up (also known as The Intent 2) is a 2018 British crime thriller film directed by, written by and starring Femi Oyeniran. It stars Ghetts in the lead role with Dylan Dufus and Ashley Chin reprising their role from the first film. It is the prequel to The Intent.

Plot
Jay (Ghetts) has big dreams, but his hopes are maimed by his allegiance to both his crew and Hackney crime boss Beverley (Sharon Duncan-Brewster). Jay sets about setting the grounds for his own organised crime ring with the help of Mustafa (Adam Deacon). Things are progressing well until Beverley discovers his treachery, and an ill-fated burglary in North London and a trip to Jamaica rips the crew apart. Whilst their operations are being watched by an undercover  Police officer Gunz (Dylan Duffus), who has been used to integrate himself into the crew.

Cast

 Ghetts as Jay
Dylan Dufus as Gunz
Ashley Chin as G Money
Adam Deacon as Mustafa
Shone Romulus as D'Angel
Femi Oyeniran as Mitch
 Nicky Slimting Walker as Shane
 Fekky as Blacks
 Krept as Daniel
 Konan as Leon
 Popcaan as Soursop
 Tanika Bailey as Peaches
 Sharon Duncan-Brewster as Beverley
 Lady Leshurr (cameo)
 Yxng Bane (cameo)
 Karen Bryson as Sergeant Walker
 Sarah Akokhia as Sergeant Rebecca Smith
 Selva Rasalingam as Mehmet
 Jay Brown as DCI Mckenzie 
 Minaj as Minaj

Critical reception
The film received a 2/5 from The Guardian who described the film as "a near-fatal combination of creative ADHD and directorial ego yanks us away from these strengths and back towards these films’ dunderheaded raison d’etre: giving posturing musicians-not-quite-turned-actors the chance to engage in generally indifferent gunplay."

Proposed sequel
In an interview, Femi stated that he'd like to do a third film as the original movie ended on a cliffhanger, he said that this one has to do well in the box office first. On 25 January 2020, it was announced on The Intents Instagram page that Scorcher will return as Hoods in the third film and Burna Boy will be joining the acting team.

References

External links

2018 films
2018 crime thriller films
British crime thriller films
British independent films
Films about drugs
Films shot in London
Black British cinema
Black British mass media
Black British films
Hood films
Films set in London
2018 directorial debut films
2018 independent films
2010s English-language films
2010s American films
2010s British films